The 1958–59 National Football League was the 28th staging of the National Football League (NFL), an annual Gaelic football tournament for the Gaelic Athletic Association county teams of Ireland.

Leitrim reached their first and only NFL semi-final, and Derry reached their first final, where they lost to Kerry.

Format

Group stage

Division IV

Final

Group A

Group B

Knockout stage

Semi-finals

Final

References

External links
, a British Pathé newsreel of the final

National Football League
National Football League
National Football League (Ireland) seasons